Molly Kathryn Mackey (born December 3, 1992) is an American softball player and coach.

Career
Mackey attended Overton High School in Overton, Texas. She later attended Angelina College and Kilgore College, before transferring to the University of Louisiana at Monroe, where she played first base and designated player for the Louisiana–Monroe Warhawks softball team. After graduating from Louisiana–Monroe, Mackey served as an assistant softball coach at Galveston College and LeTourneau University, before being named head softball coach at Sabine High School in Liberty City, Texas on June 14, 2017. Mackey was named head softball and volleyball coach at Union Grove High School in Union Grove, Texas on June 1, 2020.

Head coaching record

Softball

Volleyball

References

External links
 
 Louisiana–Monroe profile

1992 births
Living people
American softball coaches
American softball players
College softball coaches in the United States
Louisiana–Monroe Warhawks softball players
People from Overton, Texas